Zorphwar is a play-by-mail game that was published by Zorph Enterprises.

Gameplay
Zorphwar was a game in which players had a base ship-factory allowing them to construct ships of varying sizes. This computer-moderated tactical space game comprised eight players leading customizable fleets of ships on a 256 × 256 grid map to destroy opposing ships. Players scored points per enemy ship destroyed, with the highest total winning the game.

Ship types included: Scouts, Escorts, Cutters, Lasers, Harriers, Kamikazes, Repulsors, Juggernauts, and Base Ships, which varied in Cost, Energy, Acceleration, Phasors, Tubes, and special weapons available.

Reception
Sam Moorer reviewed Zorphwar in The Space Gamer No. 45. Moorer commented that "Despite its flaws and imbalances the fast pace and brisk combat gives the biggest bang for the buck in PBM today. But it's not for the role-players or those who prefer complex games with diplomatic maneuvers."

A.D. Young reviewed the game in the Summer 1984 issue of Flagship. He found the game challenging to win, noting "a combination of mobility and exotic weaponry. [Zorphwar] has a highly maneuverable and dynamically realistic movement system which is played on the surface of a toroid (donut)".

A reviewer in the November–December 1983 issue of PBM Universal described the game as challenging and "the most tactically demanding design on the market, requiring much analytical skill and hours at the calculator".

See also
 List of play-by-mail games

References

Bibliography
 
 
 

Play-by-mail games